Toledo Villa FC is a pre-professional soccer club in Toledo, Ohio competing in the Valley Division of the Central Conference in USL League Two. They previously played in the Premier League of America, United Premier Soccer League, and National Premier Soccer League.

History

Founded in 2017, through a partnership of Pacesetter Soccer Club, Northaven Group (both from Sylvania, Ohio), Total Sports, Inc. (from Wixom, Michigan), and a private, Michigan-based group. The club joined the Premier League of America for its 2017 season, playing in the East Division.

The club joined the United Premier Soccer League for the 2018 season in the East Division, after the Premier League of America folded following the 2017 season and 11 of the 12 member clubs moved to form the Midwest Conference in the UPSL. They won their division in their debut season, before falling in the first round of the Midwest Conference playoffs.

In April 2018, a new ownership group, consisting of Aaron Swiggum, Brett Stamats, and David Hammack, purchased the club. Their goal was to join the USL divisions by 2020.

For the 2019 season, the club moved to the National Premier Soccer League, joining the Great Lakes Conference.

In 2021, the club announced they would join USL League Two, where they will play in the Great Lakes Division.

Year-by-year

References

USL League Two teams
Association football clubs established in 2017
Soccer clubs in Ohio
2017 establishments in Ohio
Premier League of America teams
United Premier Soccer League teams
National Premier Soccer League teams
Sports teams in Toledo, Ohio